Rikki Ferguson (born 8 August 1956) is a Scottish former professional footballer who played for most of his career at Hamilton Academical, playing as a goalkeeper. He also had short spells at Bellfield, Greenock Morton, Partick Thistle and Queen of the South.

References

1956 births
Living people
Scottish Football League players
Scottish footballers
Hamilton Academical F.C. players
Greenock Morton F.C. players
Partick Thistle F.C. players
Queen of the South F.C. players
Scotland under-21 international footballers
Association football goalkeepers
Footballers from Kilmarnock